Carroll Glacier is a  long glacier located in Glacier Bay National Park and Preserve in the U.S. state of Alaska.

See also
 List of glaciers

References

Glaciers of Glacier Bay National Park and Preserve
Glaciers of Hoonah–Angoon Census Area, Alaska
Glaciers of Unorganized Borough, Alaska